Salticus austinensis, the zebra spider, is a species of jumping spider. It is found in the United States, Mexico, and Central America.

References

External links

 

Salticidae
Articles created by Qbugbot
Spiders described in 1936